In mathematics, more specifically general topology, the divisor topology is a specific topology on the set  of positive integers greater than or equal to two.

Construction 

The open sets in this topology are the lower sets for the partial order defined by  if .  The closed sets are the upper sets for this partial order.

Properties 

So the divisor topology is an Alexandrov topology.
  is a T0 space.
  is a not a T1 space, as no point is closed.  Consequently,  is not Hausdorff.
In fact, every dense open set must include every prime, and therefore  is a Baire space.
  is second-countable.
  is ultraconnected, since the closures of the singletons  and  contain the product  as a common element.
 Hence  is a normal space. But  is not completely normal.
  is not a regular space, as a basic neighborhood  is finite, but the closure of a point is infinite.
  is connected, locally connected, path connected and locally path connected.
  is a scattered space, as each nonempty subset has a first element, which is an isolated element of the set.
In particular,  is not compact.
  is locally compact in the sense that each point has a compact neighborhood ( is finite).  But points don't have closed compact neighborhoods ( is not locally relatively compact.)

References 

 

Topological spaces